Loilong (also known as Lwelong) was a Shan state in the Myelat region of what is today Burma. Its capital was Pinlaung. It had a large Pa-O population.

References

19th century in Burma
Shan States